24 Hours to Kill (aka Twenty-Four Hours to Kill and In Beirut sind die Nächte lang) is a 1965 British/German international co-production drama film shot in Techniscope and Technicolor that was filmed in the Lebanon, then a tax haven. It was produced by Harry Alan Towers, directed by Peter Bezencenet, and stars Lex Barker, Mickey Rooney and Walter Slezak.

Plot
A Transcontinental Airlines airliner on an international flight develops engine trouble en route to Athens. Pilot Jamie Faulkner (Lex Barker) is forced to land in Beirut, where the aircraft is to layover for 24 hours. Although the crew look forward to rest and relaxation in the then glamorous tourist hot spot, one of the crew members is in fear of his life due to his being a target of a criminal organisation based in the city.

Purser Norman Jones (Mickey Rooney), on the run from a gang of gold smugglers headed by Malouf (Walter Slezak), a smuggler, gains the sympathy of the flight's captain and other members of the crew who believe that Jones has been wrongly associated with the syndicate.

The gang twice attempts to kill Jones and tries to kidnap air hostess Louise Braganza (Helga Sommerfeld), the captain's girl friend. Jamie learns that Jones is a member of Malouf's gang and has actually stolen £40,000 worth of bullion from the syndicate.

Although the gangsters kidnap air hostess Françoise Bertram (France Anglade) to propose an exchange. Françoise, however, after a fight, is rescued by the airline crew. Jones is captured by Malouf but saved by Jamie and the crew, but just as the airliner takes off, Jones is killed by one of Malouf's men.

Cast
 Lex Barker as Captain Jamie Faulkner
 Mickey Rooney as Norman Jones
 Michael Medwin as Tommy Gaskell
 Wolfgang Lukschy as Kurt Hoffner
 Helga Sommerfeld as Louise Braganza 
 France Anglade as Françoise Bertram
 Helga Lehner as Marianne
 Walter Slezak as Malouf
 Hans Clarin as Elias
 Shakib Khouri as Andronicus
 Issam Chenawi as Assistant 
 Giancarlo Bastianoni as Killer
 Maria Rohm as Claudine

Production
24 Hours to Kill was written by Peter Yeldham who travelled to Beirut to research the film's plot. According to  German reviewer, Oliver Nöding, casting Lex barker and Mickey Rooney and using an exotic setting was standard procedure for the low-budget Towers of London production team.

The aircraft in 24 Hours to Kill included:
 Antonov An-24B 
 Convair 880-22M 
 de Havilland DH-106 Comet 4C, c/n 6446, OD-ADQ 
 Douglas DC-4
 Douglas DC-8-33
 Ilyushin Il-18
 Lockheed Constellation 
 Sud-Aviation SA316B Alouette III, c/n 1118 
 Sud-Aviation SE-210 Caravelle VI-N, c/n 174, OD-AEO

Reception
Andy Webb, writing in The Movie Scene noted the beauty of Beirut before mideast strife destroyed the once glamorous capital. Webb considered 24 Hours to Kill "quite entertaining and has a touch of 60s spy movie about it with a few moments of action, drinks laced with drugs, shady people following Norman around and of course some danger."

References

Notes

Citations

Bibliography

 Maltin, Leonard. Leonard Maltin's Movie Encyclopedia. New York: Penquin Books, 1994. .
 Mann, Dave. Harry Alan Towers: The Transnational Career of a Cinematic Contrarian. Jefferson, North Carolina: McFarland & Company, Inc., 2014. .
 Taylor, Tadhg. "Peter Yeldham Interview" in Masters of the Shoot-'Em-Up: Conversations with Directors, Actors and Writers of Vintage Action Movies and Television Shows.  Jefferson, North Carolina: McFarland & Company, Inc., 2015. .

External links
 
 
 

1965 films
British aviation films
1960s English-language films
British thriller drama films
Films set in Lebanon
Films shot in Lebanon
1960s thriller drama films
1965 drama films
Films directed by Peter Bezencenet
1960s British films